The Schulze method is an electoral system developed in 1997 by Markus Schulze that selects a single winner using votes that express preferences. The method can also be used to create a sorted list of winners. The Schulze method is also known as Schwartz Sequential dropping (SSD), cloneproof Schwartz sequential dropping (CSSD), the beatpath method, beatpath winner, path voting, and path winner. The Schulze method is a Condorcet method, which means that if there is a candidate who is preferred by a majority over every other candidate in pairwise comparisons, then this candidate will be the winner when the Schulze method is applied.

The output of the Schulze method gives an ordering of candidates. Therefore, if several positions are available, the method can be used for this purpose without modification, by letting the k top-ranked candidates win the k available seats. Furthermore, for proportional representation elections, a single transferable vote (STV) variant known as Schulze STV has been proposed. The Schulze method is used by several organizations including Wikimedia, Debian, Ubuntu, Gentoo, Pirate Party political parties and many others.

Description of the method

Ballot 

The input for the Schulze method is the same as for other ranked single-winner electoral systems: each voter must furnish an ordered preference list on candidates where ties are allowed (a strict weak order).

One typical way for voters to specify their preferences on a ballot is as follows. Each ballot lists all the candidates, and each voter ranks this list in order of preference using numbers: the voter places a '1' beside the most preferred candidate(s), a '2' beside the second-most preferred, and so forth. Each voter may optionally:
 give the same preference to more than one candidate. This indicates that this voter is indifferent between these candidates.
 use non-consecutive numbers to express preferences. This has no impact on the result of the elections, since only the order in which the candidates are ranked by the voter matters, and not the absolute numbers of the preferences.
 keep candidates unranked. When a voter doesn't rank all candidates, then this is interpreted as if this voter (i) strictly prefers all ranked to all unranked candidates, and (ii) is indifferent among all unranked candidates.

Computation 
Let  be the number of voters who prefer candidate  to candidate .

A path from candidate  to candidate  is a sequence of candidates  with the following properties:
 For all .
In other words, in a pairwise comparison, each candidate in the path will beat the following candidate.

The strength  of a path from candidate  to candidate  is the smallest number of voters in the sequence of comparisons:
 For all .

For a pair of candidates  and  that are connected by at least one path, the strength of the strongest path  is the maximum strength of the path(s) connecting them. If there is no path from candidate  to candidate  at all, then .

Candidate  is better than candidate  if and only if .

Candidate  is a potential winner if and only if  for every other candidate .

It can be proven that  and  together imply .

Example 
In the following example 45 voters rank 5 candidates.

The pairwise preferences have to be computed first. The full set of pairwise preferences is:

The cells for d[X, Y] have a light green background if d[X, Y] > d[Y, X], otherwise the background is light red. There is no undisputed winner by only looking at the pairwise differences here.

Now the strongest paths have to be identified. To help visualize the strongest paths, the set of pairwise preferences is depicted in the diagram on the right in the form of a directed graph.  An arrow from the node representing a candidate X to the one representing a candidate Y is labelled with d[X, Y].  To avoid cluttering the diagram, an arrow has only been drawn from X to Y when d[X, Y] > d[Y, X] (i.e. the table cells with light green background), omitting the one in the opposite direction (the table cells with light red background).

One example of computing the strongest path strength is p[B, D] = 33: the strongest path from B to D is the direct path (B, D) which has strength 33. But when computing p[A, C], the strongest path from A to C is not the direct path (A, C) of strength 26, rather the strongest path is the indirect path (A, D, C) which has strength min(30, 28) = 28. The strength of a path is the strength of its weakest link.

For each pair of candidates X and Y, the following table shows the strongest path from candidate X to candidate Y in red, with the weakest link underlined.

Now the output of the Schulze method can be determined.
since , for the Schulze method candidate  is better than candidate . In other words,  wins since  for every other candidate X.

Implementation 
The only difficult step in implementing the Schulze method is computing the strongest path strengths. However, this is a well-known problem in graph theory sometimes called the widest path problem. One simple way to compute the strengths, therefore, is a variant of the Floyd–Warshall algorithm. The following pseudocode illustrates the algorithm.

# Input: d[i,j], the number of voters who prefer candidate i to candidate j.
# Output: p[i,j], the strength of the strongest path from candidate i to candidate j.

for i from 1 to C
    for j from 1 to C
        if i ≠ j then
            if d[i,j] > d[j,i] then
                p[i,j] := d[i,j]
            else
                p[i,j] := 0

for i from 1 to C
    for j from 1 to C
        if i ≠ j then
            for k from 1 to C
                if i ≠ k and j ≠ k then
                    p[j,k] := max (p[j,k], min (p[j,i], p[i,k]))

This algorithm is efficient and has running time O(C3) where C is the number of candidates.

Ties and alternative implementations 
When allowing users to have ties in their preferences, the outcome of the Schulze method naturally depends on how these ties are interpreted in defining d[*,*]. Two natural choices are that d[A, B] represents either the number of voters who strictly prefer A to B (A>B), or the margin of (voters with A>B) minus (voters with B>A). But no matter how the ds are defined, the Schulze ranking has no cycles, and assuming the ds are unique it has no ties.

Although ties in the Schulze ranking are unlikely, they are possible. Schulze's original paper proposed breaking ties in accordance with a voter selected at random, and iterating as needed.

An alternative way to describe the winner of the Schulze method is the following procedure:
 draw a complete directed graph with all candidates, and all possible edges between candidates
 iteratively [a] delete all candidates not in the Schwartz set (i.e. any candidate x which cannot reach all others who reach x) and [b] delete the graph edge with the smallest value (if by margins, smallest margin; if by votes, fewest votes).
 the winner is the last non-deleted candidate.

There is another alternative way to demonstrate the winner of the Schulze method. This method is equivalent to the others described here, but the presentation is optimized for the significance of steps being visually apparent as a human goes through it, not for computation.
 Make the results table, called the "matrix of pairwise preferences," such as used above in the example. If using margins rather than raw vote totals, subtract it from its transpose. Then every positive number is a pairwise win for the candidate on that row (and marked green), ties are zeroes, and losses are negative (marked red). Order the candidates by how long they last in elimination.
 If there is a candidate with no red on their line, they win.
 Otherwise, draw a square box around the Schwartz set in the upper left corner. It can be described as the minimal "winner's circle" of candidates who do not lose to anyone outside the circle. Note that to the right of the box there is no red, which means it is a winner's circle, and note that within the box there is no reordering possible that would produce a smaller winner's circle.
 Cut away every part of the table outside the box.
 If there is still no candidate with no red on their line, something needs to be compromised on; every candidate lost some race, and the loss we tolerate the best is the one where the loser obtained the most votes. So, take the red cell with the highest number (if going by margins, the least negative), make it green—or any color other than red—and go back step 2.

Here is a margins table made from the above example. Note the change of order used for demonstration purposes.

The first drop (A's loss to E by 1 vote) doesn't help shrink the Schwartz set.

So we get straight to the second drop (E's loss to C by 3 votes), and that shows us the winner, E, with its clear row.

This method can also be used to calculate a result, if the table is remade in such a way that one can conveniently and reliably rearrange the order of the candidates on both the row and the column, with the same order used on both at all times.

Satisfied and failed criteria

Satisfied criteria 
The Schulze method satisfies the following criteria:

 Unrestricted domain
 Non-imposition (a.k.a. citizen sovereignty)
 Non-dictatorship
 Pareto criterion
 Monotonicity criterion
 Majority criterion
 Majority loser criterion
 Condorcet criterion
 Condorcet loser criterion
 Schwartz criterion
 Smith criterion
 Independence of Smith-dominated alternatives
 Mutual majority criterion
 Independence of clones
 Reversal symmetry
 Mono-append
 Mono-add-plump
 Resolvability criterion
 Polynomial runtime
 prudence
 MinMax sets
 Woodall's plurality criterion if winning votes are used for d[X,Y]
 Symmetric-completion if margins are used for d[X,Y]

Failed criteria 
Since the Schulze method satisfies the Condorcet criterion, it automatically fails the following criteria:
 Participation
 Consistency
 Invulnerability to compromising
 Invulnerability to burying
 Later-no-harm

Likewise, since the Schulze method is not a dictatorship and agrees with unanimous votes, Arrow's Theorem implies it fails the criterion
 Independence of irrelevant alternatives

The Schulze method also fails
 Peyton Young's criterion Local Independence of Irrelevant Alternatives.

Comparison table 
The following table compares the Schulze method with other preferential single-winner election methods:

The main difference between the Schulze method and the ranked pairs method can be seen in this example:

Suppose the MinMax score of a set X of candidates is the strength of the strongest pairwise win of a candidate A ∉ X against a candidate B ∈ X. Then the Schulze method, but not Ranked Pairs, guarantees that the winner is always a candidate of the set with minimum MinMax score. So, in some sense, the Schulze method minimizes the largest majority that has to be reversed when determining the winner.

On the other hand, Ranked Pairs minimizes the largest majority that has to be reversed to determine the order of finish, in the minlexmax sense. 
In other words, when Ranked Pairs and the Schulze method produce different orders of finish, for the majorities on which the two orders of finish disagree, the Schulze order reverses a larger majority than the Ranked Pairs order.

History 
The Schulze method was developed by Markus Schulze in 1997. It was first discussed in public mailing lists in 1997–1998 and in 2000. 

In 2011, Schulze published the method in the academic journal Social Choice and Welfare.

Usage

Government 
The Schulze method is used by the city of Silla for all referendums. It is also used by the cities of Turin and San Donà di Piave and by the London Borough of Southwark through their use of the WeGovNow platform, which in turn uses the LiquidFeedback decision tool.

Political parties 
Schulze was adopted by the Pirate Party of Sweden (2009), and the Pirate Party of Germany (2010). The newly formed Boise, Idaho chapter of the Democratic Socialists of America in February chose this method for their first special election held in March 2018.

 Five Star Movement of Campobasso, Fondi, Monte Compatri, Montemurlo, Pescara, and San Cesareo
 Pirate Parties of Australia, Austria, Belgium, Brazil, Germany, Iceland, Italy, the Netherlands, Sweden, Switzerland, and the United States
 SustainableUnion
 Volt Europe

Student government and associations 

 AEGEE - European Students' Forum
 Club der Ehemaligen der Deutschen SchülerAkademien e. V.
 Associated Student Government at École normale supérieure de Paris
 Flemish Society of Engineering Students Leuven
 Graduate Student Organization at the State University of New York: Computer Science (GSOCS)
 Hillegass Parker House
 Kingman Hall
 Associated Students of Minerva​ ​Schools​ ​at​ ​KGI
 Associated Student Government at Northwestern University
 Associated Student Government at University of Freiburg
 Associated Student Government at the Computer Sciences Department of the University of Kaiserslautern

Organizations 
It is used by the Institute of Electrical and Electronics Engineers, by the Association for Computing Machinery, and by USENIX through their use of the HotCRP decision tool.

In the French Wikipedia, the Schulze method was one of two multi-candidate methods approved by a majority in 2005, and it has been used several times. 

Organizations which currently use the Schulze method include:

 Annodex Association
  (BVKJ)
 BoardGameGeek
 Cloud Foundry Foundation
 County Highpointers
 Dapr
 Debian
 EuroBillTracker
 European Democratic Education Community (EUDEC)
 FFmpeg
 Free Geek
  Free Hardware Foundation of Italy
 Gentoo Foundation
 GNU Privacy Guard (GnuPG)
 Haskell
 Homebrew
 Internet Corporation for Assigned Names and Numbers (ICANN)
  Kanawha Valley Scrabble Club
 KDE e.V.
 Knight Foundation
 Kubernetes
 Kumoricon
 League of Professional System Administrators (LOPSA)
 LiquidFeedback 
 Madisonium
 Metalab
 Music Television (MTV)
 Neo
 Noisebridge
 OpenEmbedded
 Open Neural Network Exchange
 OpenStack
 OpenSwitch
 RLLMUK
 Squeak
 Students for Free Culture
 Sugar Labs
 Sverok
 TopCoder
 Ubuntu
 Vidya Gaem Awards
 Wikimedia (2008)
 Wikipedia in French, Hebrew, Hungarian, Russian, and Persian.

Notes

External links 

 The Schulze Method of Voting by Markus Schulze
 The Schulze Method by Hubert Bray
 Spieltheorie  by Bernhard Nebel
 Accurate Democracy by Rob Loring
 Christoph Börgers (2009), Mathematics of Social Choice: Voting, Compensation, and Division, SIAM, 
 Nicolaus Tideman (2006), Collective Decisions and Voting: The Potential for Public Choice, Burlington: Ashgate, 
 preftools by the Public Software Group
 Arizonans for Condorcet Ranked Voting
 Condorcet PHP Command line application and PHP library, supporting multiple Condorcet methods, including Schulze.
 Implementation in Java
 Implementation in Ruby
 Implementation in Python 2
 Implementation in Python 3

Articles with example pseudocode
Debian
Electoral systems
Monotonic Condorcet methods
Single-winner electoral systems